Rhodiola is a genus of perennial plants in the family Crassulaceae that resemble Sedum and other members of the family.  Like sedums, Rhodiola species are often called stonecrops.  Some authors merge Rhodiola into Sedum.

Rhodiola species grow in high-altitude and other cold regions of the Northern Hemisphere.  Plants of the World Online gives the number of accepted species as 69, the Angiosperm Phylogeny Website gives it as 90, and the Flora of China gives it as about 90, with 55 in China and 16 endemic there.  Flora of North America lists only three species in the United States and Canada.

Description 

Among the distinguishing characters of the genus are two series of stamens totaling twice the number of petals; free or nearly free petals (not joined in a tube); a stout rhizome from whose axils the flowering stems rise; and a basal rosette of leaves.  This genus contains the only species of Crassulaceae that have unisexual flowers.

Phytochemistry 

Rhodionin is a herbacetin rhamnoside found in Rhodiola species.
Rhodiolin [86831-53-0]
Rhodiolgin [94696-39-6]

Taxonomy 

Although Linnaeus distinguished Rhodiola from Sedum on the basis of being dioecious, it was later submerged in the latter genus until the twentieth century, when it was restored, on the basis of well developed rhizomes and annual flowering stems, arising from axils of the scaly radical leaves. This separation was subsequently confirmed by molecular phylogenetic studies. 

Rhodiola is placed within family Crassulaceae, in subfamily Sempervivoideae, tribe Umbiliceae. There it is a sister group to Pseudosedum, though some authors have suggested that the latter genus be submersed within Rhodiola.

Subdivision 

Traditionally Rhodiola was divided into subgenera, sections and series, based on plant characteristics. Four subgenera were recognised; Rhodiola, Primuloides, Crassipedes and Clementsia. However molecular studies have failed to demonstrate monophyly of these subtaxa.

Species include:
Rhodiola integrifolia
Rhodiola crenulata
Rhodiola cretinii
Rhodiola imbricata
Rhodiola kirilowii
Rhodiola rhodantha
Rhodiola rosea
Rhodiola tibetica
Rhodiola quadrifida

Etymology 

The name combines the Greek rhodon, meaning rose and referring to the rose-like smell of the roots, with the Latin diminutive suffix -iola.

Ecology 

Dioecy, having separate male and female flowers, has evolved at least three times in the genus, and reversals to a hermaphrodite condition have also occurred, which is a rare occurrence in flowering plants. It has been suggested that dioecy in the genus may correlate with abiotic pollination in the cold environment.

Uses 

The Holarctic species Rhodiola rosea is used in herbal medicine.  A number of species are grown as ornamentals, but growing them is difficult outside their native subarctic and alpine climates.

In TCM, Rhodiola is known as Hong Jing Tian (红景天) and is used for fatigue, hypoxia, radiation, etc.

References

Bibliography 

 
 , see also Species Plantarum 
  (full text at ResearchGate)
 
 
 
  (see also Angiosperm Phylogeny Website)

Crassulaceae
Crassulaceae genera